Tritonia hirondelle is a species of dendronotid nudibranch. It is a marine gastropod mollusc in the family Tritoniidae.

Distribution
This species was found off the island of Fogo in the Cape Verde islands, at 260 m depth,  on a bright yellow octocoral, Acanthogorgia sp.

References

Tritoniidae
Gastropods described in 2020